Nánjiē (南街) may refer to the following locations in China:

Community
 Nanjie, Zhucheng, village in Zhucheng Subdistrict, Xinzhou District, Wuhan, Hubei

Subdistricts
 Nanjie Subdistrict, Fuzhou, in Gulou District, Fuzhou, Fujian
 Nanjie Subdistrict, Qingyang, in Xifeng District, Qingyang, Gansu
 Nanjie Subdistrict, Zhangye, in Ganzhou District, Zhangye, Gansu
 Nanjie Subdistrict, Anshun, in Xixiu District, Anshun, Guizhou
 Nanjie Subdistrict, Changchun, in Nanguan District, Changchun, Jilin
 Nanjie Subdistrict, Jinzhou, in Guta District, Jinzhou, Liaoning
 Nanjie Subdistrict, Lingyuan, Liaoning
 Nanjie Subdistrict, Shizuishan, in Huinong District, Shizuishan, Ningxia
 Nanjie Subdistrict, Changzhi, in Chengqu, Changzhi, Shanxi
 Nanjie Subdistrict, Datong, in Chengqu, Datong, Shanxi
 Nanjie Subdistrict, Jincheng, in Chengqu, Jincheng, Shanxi
 Nanjie Subdistrict, Linfen, Shanxi
 Nanjie Subdistrict, Huili County, in Huili County, Sichuan

Town
 Nanjie, Guangning County, town in Guangdong

Village
 Nanjie, Linying County, village in Henan